The Association for Decentralised Energy (ADE), formerly the Combined Heat and Power Association, is an advocate of an integrated approach to delivering energy locally. The ADE was founded in 1967 as the District Heating Association, becoming the Combined Heat and Power Association in 1983, and was then renamed to the Association for Decentralised Energy on 12 January 2015. The ADE has over 100 members.

The ADE acts as an advocate for its members by engaging with Government and key decision makers to support cost effective and efficient solutions to industry, businesses and householders by:

 Developing a policy which puts the energy user's needs first
 Delivering a local, low carbon energy system at lowest cost
 Ensuring an understanding of heat, which makes up half of our energy use
 Taking an integrated and 'systems thinking' approach
 Helping users manage energy demand to limit the need for new generation capacity
 Strengthening the sector's reputation through industry standards and best practice

The Association also provide secretariat for the Independent Heat Customer Protection Scheme.

See also
 Department of Energy and Climate Change

External links
 

Energy organizations
Electric power in the United Kingdom
Organizations established in 1967
Trade associations based in the United Kingdom